Kiril Marichkov (30 October 1944 in Sofia) is a Bulgarian rock musician.

Biography 
Marichkov was born in Sofia and played piano, clarinet, bass-guitar and guitar since young age. In 1963 he founded one of the first Bulgarian rock bands, the "Bandaracite" (Бъндараците) and in 1967 one of the most successful bands in Bulgaria during the 70s and 80s (with still many fans) - "Shturtzite" ("The Crickets", Щурците). Since its foundation, Kiril Marichkov has been the frontman (lead vocal, bass guitar and keyboards) of the band. He has also composed a large part of their songs, which approximate 160, in fourteen albums. Shturcite have performed over 2600 concerts in sixteen countries.

In his discography Kiril Marichkov has two solo albums - "Zodija Shturec" ("Starsign Cricket", Зодия Щурец, 1997) and "Iskam da kazha" ("I want to say", Искам да кажа) which gave birth to several hits including "Vjarvam v teb ("I believe in you", Вярвам в теб), "Kletva" ("Vow", Клетва), "Obicham te zavinagi" ("I love you forever", Обичам те завинаги) and "Mojat svjat" ("My world", Моят свят).

Apart from his career as a rock musician, Kiril Marichkov has composed soundtracks for the movies "Vchera" ("Yesterday", Вчера)  (with the "Kletva"  song), Rio Adio (Адио Рио) in 1989
, "Indianski igri" ("Indian games", Индиански игри) 
, "Vampiri-talasymi" ("Vampires-ghouls", Вампири-таласъми)
, "Dunav most" ("The bridge over Danube", Дунав мост) (with the "Mojat svjat" song), "Naj-vazhnite neshta" ("The most important things", Най-важните неща) (with the "Obicham the zavinagi" song) etc.

He is a co-founder of the only Bulgarian Rock-radiostation "Radio Tangra" (Радио Тангра), today "Radio Gong" (Радио Гонг).

In 1990, at a time of great political changes at the fall of the Communist regime in Bulgaria, his song "Az sym prosto Chovek" ("I'm only Human", Аз съм просто Човек) became one of the new democracy's anthems, sung by hundreds of thousands of people on the new democratic political rallies. During this period Kiril Marichkov was elected member of the Grand National Assembly as a part of the Union of Democratic Forces.

In 2013, after Shturcite broke up, he formed a band called Fondatsiata (The Foundation) with other famous Bulgarian rock musicians, including Ivan Lechev (ex-FSB) and Dobrin "Doni" Vekilov (ex-Doni i Momchil).

Discography

With "Shturtzite"

Solo

References

External links 

 Kiril Marichkov at Bulgarian Rock Archives

1944 births
Living people
Members of the National Assembly (Bulgaria)
Bulgarian rock singers
Bulgarian rock guitarists
20th-century Bulgarian male singers
Musicians from Sofia
21st-century Bulgarian male singers